Germaine Cousin-Zermatten, born in Switzerland on 22 April 1925 in Saint-Martin in the canton of Valais, is a Swiss herbalist and author who—following personal research aimed to compile an ancestral knowledge only transmitted orally—has written several books devoted to the phytotherapeutic properties of medicinal plants located in the Val d’Hérens region.

Works 
 
 German version:

References

Sources

Bibliography

Radio document

Videography 
  URL 2

External links 

1925 births
Living people
Herbalists
People from Valais
People in alternative medicine
Food writers
20th-century Swiss women writers
21st-century Swiss women writers